The family of Northwest Solomonic languages is a branch of the Oceanic languages. It includes the Austronesian languages of Bougainville and Buka in Papua New Guinea, and of Choiseul, New Georgia, and Santa Isabel (excluding Bugotu) in Solomon Islands.

The unity of Northwest Solomonic and the number and composition of its subgroups, along with its relationship to other Oceanic groups, was established in pioneering work by Malcolm Ross.

Languages

Northwest Solomonic languages group as follows:

 Nehan – North Bougainville linkage
Nehan (Nissan)
Saposa–Tinputz: Hahon, Ratsua, Saposa (Taiof)–Teop, Tinputz
Buka: Halia–Hakö, Petats
Papapana
Solos
 Piva–Bannoni family:  Piva (Lawunuia), Bannoni
 Mono–Uruavan family:  Mono-Alu, Torau, Uruava
Choiseul linkage:  Babatana (including Sisingga)–Ririo, Vaghua–Varisi
New Georgia – Ysabel family 
New Georgia linkage:  Simbo (Simbo Island), Roviana–Kusaghe, Marovo, Hoava, Vangunu (Vangunu Island), Nduke (Kolombangara Island), Ghanongga (Ranongga Island),  Lungga (Ranongga Island), Ughele (North Rendova Island)
Ysabel linkage:  Zabana (Kia)–Laghu†, Kokota–Zazao (Kilokaka)–Blablanga, Gao–Cheke Holo (Maringe, Hograno)

In addition, the extinct Kazukuru language was probably one of the New Georgia languages. The unclassified extinct language Tetepare might have also been one of the New Georgia languages, if it was Austronesian at all.

Basic vocabulary
Basic vocabulary in many Northwest Solomonic languages is aberrant, and many forms do not have Proto-Oceanic cognates. Below, Ririo, Zabana, and Maringe are compared with two Southeast Solomonic languages. Aberrant forms are in bold.

{| 
! English !! arm !! ear !! liver !! bone !! skin !! louse
|-
| Proto-Oceanic ||  ||  ||  ||  ||  || 
|-
| Ririo ||  ||  ||  ||  ||  || 
|-
| Zabana ||  ||  ||  ||  ||  || 
|-
| Maringe ||  ||  ||  ||  ||  || 
|-
| Gela ||  ||  ||  ||  ||  || 
|-
| Arosi ||  ||  ||  ||  ||  || 
|}

Notes

References

Further reading
 Bill Palmer (2005). North West Solomonic materials. University of Surrey, UK.
 Bill Palmer (2010). . University of Newcastle, Australia.
Tryon, Darrell T. & B. D. Hackman. 1983. Solomon Islands Languages: An Internal Classification. (Pacific Linguistics: Series C, 72.) Canberra: Research School of Pacific and Asian Studies, Australian National University
Data set derived from Tryon & Hackman (1983):  Greenhill, Simon, & Robert Forkel. (2019). lexibank/tryonsolomon: Solomon Islands Languages (Version v3.0). Zenodo. 

 
Meso-Melanesian languages
Languages of the Solomon Islands
Languages of Papua New Guinea